Seven Twenty-Seven is the name given a variety of  Vying games similar in some respects
to poker, and often played as a "dealer's choice" variant at home poker games.
It uses the same cards, chips and betting system as poker, but the value of hands does not use traditional poker hand rankings, either high or low.
Rather, the worth of a hand depends on only the sum of the values of the cards accepted, as in 9½-29½, or 21, a/k/a Black Jack, the modern casino game which developed from this contract via Trente-et-Un and Vingt-et-Un, its seventeenth century predecessors.

The game play often proceeds like this:
 Depending on the variant chosen, play may begin with players being dealt one, two or even three cards [e.g., a single down card, a down card and an up card, or three down cards, one of which must then be rolled up].
 Betting rounds begin with the player on the dealer's left, and proceeds exactly as in poker: all players must either equal the largest bet or drop out.
 After the betting, each player remaining in turn is invited to take another card, face up, from the dealer's left, or pass. Passing on the opportunity to be dealt a card for a third time 'locks' that player's hand.  Once the final player passes for the third time, a final round of betting ensues, followed by a poker-style reckoning. 
  As there can be many rounds of betting, some home games prescribe a sum-certain bet, or limit, for all rounds, forgoing further raising of the stakes. 

Numbered cards are scored at face value; face cards, often including the 10, count for one-half a point.
Aces count for one or eleven, so a hand with a five and two aces after three scores 7 and 27 and scoops the whole pot. If a player's draw puts him over 27, he busts, as in Blackjack, and must fold.
On showdown, the pot is divided between the hand(s) valued closest to 7 and the hand(s) valued closest to 27.
In the occasion players are off by the same amount, but in different directions (6 to 8), the lower hand wins. 
If there is an exact tie, that half-pot is split again among the tied players. 
The same player may be allowed to contest for both high and low.  

There are a few variations in rules that complicate things somewhat: first, the rule about ties in different directions varies; also, some players play with a declaration, while others play cards speak. Still others require players to not go over 7 or 27 to win the respective halves of the pot; in this variant, if everyone is over 7, the player closest to 27 without going over wins the whole pot. Still other players play with other pairs of target numbers (usually 20 points apart, such as 13 and 33, or 16 and 36).

Stud poker
Vying games